The Thief is a 2006 novella by British author Ruth Rendell, published in the Quick Reads series. As an entry in said series, it is of novella length.

References

2006 British novels
British novellas
Novels by Ruth Rendell
British crime novels
Arrow Books books